Bathilukku Bathil is a 1972 Indian Tamil-language Western film directed by Jambu. The film stars A. V. M. Rajan, R. Muthuraman, C. R. Vijayakumari and Vennira Aadai Nirmala. It was released on 1 September 1972.

Plot 

A man seeks revenge on his friend, who betrayed him and stole his money, and harassed  his wife.

Cast 
A. V. M. Rajan
R. Muthuraman
C. R. Vijayakumari
Vennira Aadai Nirmala
V. K. Ramasamy
Master Prabhakar
Jayakumari
Suruli Rajan
Thengai Srinivasan
M. R. R. Vasu
Kutty Padmini
S. V. Ramadas
A. Karunanidhi
V. S. Raghavan
Ragini

Soundtrack 
The music was composed by S. M. Subbaiah Naidu.

References 

1970s Tamil-language films
1972 Western (genre) films
Indian Western (genre) films